Ak-Bulung is a village in the Ak-Suu District of Issyk-Kul Region of Kyrgyzstan. Its population was 2,546 in 2021.

Population

References

Populated places in Issyk-Kul Region